David Serrano Molina (born 25 April 1995) is a Spanish footballer who plays for UE Sant Andreu as a right winger.

Club career
Born in Premià de Mar, Barcelona, Catalonia, Serrano graduated with CF Damm's youth setup. He made his debuts as a senior with FC Martinenc in the 2014–15 campaign, suffering relegation from Tercera División.

On 23 July 2015, Serrano joined Girona FC, being assigned to the reserves in the regional leagues. He made his first team debut on 9 September, starting in a 2–2 away draw against Gimnàstic de Tarragona, for the season's Copa del Rey (4–5 loss on penalties). A few days later, he made his Segunda División debut as a substitute against SD Huesca, picking up a yellow card in a 0–0 draw.

On 20 January 2016, Serrano was loaned to Segunda División B side CF Badalona until the end of the season. Upon returning, he was assigned to the farm team in the fourth division. On 31 August 2018, he left Girona.

In January 2019, after six months of inactivity, Serrano moved abroad for the first time in his career and joined AE Karaiskakis FC. On 9 August, he returned to his home country after agreeing to a one-year deal with UE Sant Andreu in division four.

References

External links

1995 births
Living people
People from Premià de Mar
Sportspeople from the Province of Barcelona
Spanish footballers
Footballers from Catalonia
Association football wingers
Segunda División players
Segunda División B players
Tercera División players
Divisiones Regionales de Fútbol players
CF Damm players
Girona FC B players
Girona FC players
CF Badalona players
CF Peralada players
UE Sant Andreu footballers
Football League (Greece) players
A.E. Karaiskakis F.C. players
Spanish expatriate footballers
Spanish expatriate sportspeople in Greece
Expatriate footballers in Greece